The United States Postal Service (USPS) provides Priority Mail Express for domestic U.S. delivery, and offers two types of international Express Mail services, although only one of them is part of the EMS standard. One is called Priority Mail Express International and the other service is called Global Express Guaranteed (GXG). The latter has no relation to "EMS" International service as provided by the EMS Cooperative. 

The USPS Global Express Guaranteed (GXG), involves USPS offices acting as drop locations for international packages which are then handled by FedEx international delivery network.

In some countries, import rules for packages received by courier services have different tax brackets and duties than parcels received on the postal system, and thus EMS service (Express Mail International) may be preferred over FedEx's co-branded Global Express Guaranteed.

The term Priority Mail Express International is distinct from the domestic service called Priority Mail Express, which is a specific classification of mail for domestic accelerated postal delivery within the U.S.
 
In 2013, the USPS changed the name of the service from "Express Mail International" to "Priority Mail Express International". This may lead to confusion, as "Priority Mail" is still used, and the packaging is very similar.

History
Special Delivery, a domestic accelerated local delivery service, was introduced on 3 March 1885 initially with a fee of 10¢ paid by a Special Delivery stamp. It was transformed into Express Mail, introduced in 1977 after an experimental period that started in 1970, although Special Delivery was not terminated until June 8, 1997.

USPS Priority Mail Express

Priority Mail Express is an accelerated domestic mail delivery service operated by the United States Postal Service. It provides overnight delivery to most locations within the continental United States and guaranteed delivery within 2 days. Unlike most other USPS delivery options which provide only delivery confirmation, Priority Mail Express Mail provides tracking information.

Priority Mail Express delivers 365 days a year, including Saturdays, Sundays, and federal holidays.

USPS GXG

Global Express Guaranteed (GXG) service is an international expedited delivery service provided through an alliance with FedEx Corporation. It provides guaranteed, date-definite service from Post Office facilities in the United States to a large number of international destinations. Global Express Guaranteed delivery service is guaranteed to meet the specified service standards or the postage paid may be refunded. For almost all network destinations, liability insurance is provided for lost or damaged shipments.

References 

United States Postal Service
Express mail

External links 
 USPS Track & Trace(english)